Yu Hyoun-ji (born 12 October 1994) is a South Korean swimmer. She competed in the women's 50 metre backstroke event at the 2017 World Aquatics Championships.

References

External links
 

1994 births
Living people
South Korean female backstroke swimmers
Place of birth missing (living people)
Universiade silver medalists for South Korea
Universiade medalists in swimming
Medalists at the 2015 Summer Universiade